Sayyida Buthaina bint Taimur Al Said (born October 10, 1937) is a member of the Omani royal family. She is the only daughter of former Sultan Taimur bin Feisal. Her mother was a Japanese woman, Kiyoko Oyama. Buthaina is the half-sister of Sultan Said bin Taimur and the paternal aunt of the sultans Qaboos bin Said and Haitham bin Tariq.

Biography

Early life in Japan 
In 1935, at a dance hall in Kobe, Japan, a 19-year-old Japanese woman named Kiyoko Oyama met the former Sultan of Oman Taimur bin Feisal, who had recently abdicated the throne. After a brief trip home, Taimur returned to Japan in 1936, at which point he married Oyama and took up permanent residence in Japan. The couple lived in a mansion in Kobe's Fukiai-ku ward, and in 1937 they had a daughter, Buthaina, also known as Setsuko.

Buthaina's peaceful childhood was interrupted when her mother became ill with tuberculosis. She was frequently in and out of the hospital, and Taimur was worried he and his daughter could catch the disease as well, so he sent Buthaina to live with her maternal grandmother while he moved alone to Bombay. Kiyoko died in November 1939. In May 1940, Taimur returned to Japan to bury his wife. He then left Japan, bringing Buthaina with him.

Move to Oman 
In 1940, after leaving Japan and briefly staying in Karachi, Buthaina was brought to Muscat, Oman. She was placed under the care of her father's first wife Sayyida Fatima bint Ali Al Said, the mother of the heir apparent Sayyid Said bin Taimur. Buthaina's father decided to raise her completely Omani, cutting her off from her Japanese roots. She married and gave birth to a son.

Buthaina's half-brother, Sultan Said bin Taimur, kept her essentially under house arrest at the royal palace alongside his son Sayyid Qaboos bin Said, who would later depose him and become sultan himself in 1970. On taking the throne, Sultan Qaboos lifted Buthaina's house arrest, and in 1978 she was able to return to Japan for the first time, where she visited her mother's grave.

Media depictions 

References 

1937 births
Al Said dynasty
Daughters of Omani sultans
Japan–Oman relations
Omani people of Japanese descent
People from Kobe
Living people